Talybont (otherwise Tal-y-bont) may refer to:

Places in Wales

Tal-y-bont, Ceredigion
Tal-y-bont, Conwy
Talybont, Bangor
Tal-y-bont, Dyffryn Ardudwy
Talybont-on-Usk, Powys
Talybont Reservoir, Brecon Beacons
Llys Talybont Halls of Residence, Cardiff University

Other uses
"Talybont", a song on the 1975 Free Hand album by Gentle Giant
Talybont, a former name of Rheidol (locomotive)